BDO may refer to:
 BDO Global, the world's fifth-largest accountancy network 
 Banco de Oro, one of the largest banks in the Philippines
 Barton, Durstine & Osborn, the former name of advertising agency BBDO
 Behavior Detection Officer
 Big Day Out, an annual music festival held in Australia and New Zealand
 Big Dumb Object, a term used in science fiction
 Black Desert Online, an MMORPG
 Block Development Officer, the official in charge of an administrative division (Block) of some South Asian countries
 British Darts Organisation (now defunct), former governing body of British darts
 Business Depot Ogden, the former Defense Depot Ogden Utah converted into a business park
 Husein Sastranegara International Airport, the IATA code served in Bandung, Indonesia
 Butanediol, especially 1,4-Butanediol, an organic chemical compound
, German: Bund Deutscher Offiziere, an association of German prisoners of war in the Soviet Union

Computers
, an HTML element for bi-directional override, see HTML element#bdo